The Simón Bolívar Symphony Orchestra of Venezuela is a Venezuelan orchestra. Named after the Venezuelan national hero Simón Bolívar, it is the apex of the nation's system of youth orchestras, although by 2011, it was no longer officially a youth orchestra because the average age of the players had risen too high. It was replaced as the national youth orchestra by the Teresa Carreño Youth Orchestra.

The economist José Antonio Abreu established the Orquesta Sinfónica Simón Bolívar on 12 February 1978. 
Gustavo Dudamel has been the orchestra's artistic director since 1999.  The orchestra has worked with many famous conductors including Claudio Abbado and Simon Rattle.

Social Action Through Music
Venezuela's youth orchestras are run under the auspices of the Fundación Musical Simón Bolívar (FMSB), formerly known as the Fundacion del Estado para el Sistema Nacional de las Orquestas Juveniles e Infantiles de Venezuela, known colloquially as El Sistema.

Based in Caracas, the orchestra moved its home in 2007 from the Teresa Carreño Cultural Complex to a new Center for Social Action Through Music nearby. The name of the center reflects the fact that El Sistema sees itself as a social agency:
Most of its music students come from poor socio-economic backgrounds.

Reception in the UK
In August 2007, the orchestra made its debut at the BBC Proms, to critical acclaim and an enthusiastic reception from the audience. The concert was broadcast live on BBC Radio 3 and deferred live on BBC Four TV.

A BBC TV documentary programme in the Imagine arts series, first shown on 18 November 2008, examined the history and ethos of the orchestra and its role in tackling the social problems of Venezuela and its success in transforming the lives of some of the nation's poorest children, including interviews with Dudamel, key members of the orchestra, and current and former students. Hosted by Alan Yentob, the film took a detailed look at the unique music education system of Venezuela, of which the orchestra is an integral part, and described a recent attempt to imitate its success in Raploch, a deprived district of the city of Stirling, Scotland.

The cellist Julian Lloyd Webber was appointed chairman of the steering group of In Harmony, a British government-led music education and community development project which is based on El Sistema and which planned a three-year project in three impoverished areas of England.  It began in 2009.

Reception in the US
In 2007, the orchestra and Dudamel appeared at Carnegie Hall.
In 2012 the music critic of the London Times stated his opinion that the high international profile of the Venezuelan orchestra under Dudamel was a factor in the creation of a national youth orchestra in the United States.

Discography
The orchestra and Dudamel have made four recordings for Deutsche Grammophon, one of Beethoven; one of Mahler one of Tchaikovsky; and a collection of Latin American music.

The orchestra previously released other recordings, including several ballet pieces, in the early 1990s on the Dorian Recordings label.

See also 
 List of youth orchestras

References

External links
 [https://web.archive.org/web/20100103094434/http://fesnojiv.gob.ve/en.html El Sistema'''s official website (FESNOJIV)]
Featured in segment on Gustavo Dudamel on CBS News 60 Minutes'' (video and transcript)
 Orquesta Sinfónica Juvenil Simón Bolivar (YouTube Video)

Youth orchestras
Venezuelan orchestras
National youth orchestras
Musical groups established in 1975
1975 establishments in Venezuela
Youth organizations based in Venezuela